A referendum on whether the Regierungsverweser J Peer should remain in office was held in Liechtenstein on 28 March 1921. Around 62% voted in favour of Peer continuing in office.

Results

References

1921 referendums
1921 in Liechtenstein
Referendums in Liechtenstein
March 1921 events